Gabriel "Gabi" Neumark (גבי נוימרק; August 17, 1946 – December 4, 2000) was an Israeli basketball player. He played for the Israeli Basketball Premier League, and for the Israeli national basketball team.

Biography

Neumark's hometown was Netanya, Israel. He was 1.98 m (6 ft 6 in) tall.

Neumark started his basketball career at Maccabi Netanya. He played for  15 years in the Israeli Basketball Premier League. He played for Maccabi Tel Aviv, Maccabi Haifa, and Betar Tel Aviv.

He played for the Israeli national basketball team in the 1972 Pre-Olympic Basketball Tournament, 1969 European Championship for Men, 1970 Asian Games Basketball Championship (winning the silver medal), and 1973 European Championship for Men.

Neumark died at 54 years old from lung cancer. His funeral was in Moshav Avihayil, in central Israel, where he lived.

References 

1946 births
2000 deaths
Israeli men's basketball players
Maccabi Tel Aviv B.C. players
Maccabi Haifa B.C. players
Israeli Basketball Premier League players
People from Netanya
Moshavniks
Jews in Mandatory Palestine
Basketball players at the 1970 Asian Games
Medalists at the 1970 Asian Games
Asian Games medalists in basketball
Asian Games silver medalists for Israel
Deaths from lung cancer